is the largest island in the island chain south of Shimoshima Island, Amakusa. Its coasts are washed by Yatsuhiro Sea, Hachimannoseto strait and East China Sea. Nagashima Island, together with Shishi-jima,  and  islands, has been administered as part of Nagashima town since 2006. The island's highest peak is Mount Dainaka-dake , although Mount Yatake is only slightly lower at

Transportation
Nagashima Island is connected to the Kyushu mainland by the  bridge (completed in 1974) over 400-meter wide strait.　It is also connected to Ikara Island by  since 1990 and to 　since 1966. The national roads serving the island is Route 389.

At ferry line also connects Nagashima Island to the Shimoshima island.

History
Nagashima is believed to be the place where Tangerine (Citrus unshiu) was introduced to Japan in the early Edo period. Later in the Edo period the island was notable for its fruit gardens and horse grazing meadows. Modern Nagashima is concentrated on the food industry, in particular on alcoholic beverages, garments, shoes, and electronics manufacture.

Climate
Nagashima Island is located in the humid subtropical climate zone (Köppen Cfa), with four distinct seasons. The island never sees snowfall during the winter. Spring in Shimoshima Island starts off mild, but ends up being hot and humid. The summer tends to be Shimoshima's wettest season, with the  — the rainy season — occurring between early June (average:Jun.7) to late July (average:Jul.21). The island's weather is affected by the nearby  while being shielded from the warm Kuroshio Current by the Kyushu island, resulting in wetter and colder climate than should be expected at lower 30`s latitudes.

Attractions
 at

See also
Nagashima, Kagoshima
Amakusa

References
This article incorporates material from Japanese Wikipedia page 長島 (鹿児島県), accessed 23 August 2017

Islands of Kagoshima Prefecture
Islands of the East China Sea